Jim Babjak (born November 17, 1957) is an American guitarist and ex-banker. He is the lead guitar player and co-founder of The Smithereens. Babjak has written and sung several songs for the band.  He also is the leader of the band Buzzed Meg.

Origins 
Babjak, from Carteret, New Jersey, formed The Smithereens together with fellow Carteret High School alumni Dennis Diken and Mike Mesaros, along with Pat DiNizio of Scotch Plains, New Jersey.

Appearances 
Babjak's music can be heard in the films Bull Durham, Backdraft, Encino Man, Time Cop, Romy & Michele's High School Reunion, Boys Don't Cry,  Burglar, Cruel Intentions 2, Harold and Kumar Go To White Castle, and I Now Pronounce You Chuck & Larry. The band made a cameo appearance in the film Class of Nuke 'Em High.

Other accomplishments include musical compositions and performances for the soap operas Passions and The Guiding Light, as well as television and radio commercials for Dairy Queen and Nissan Maxima.

Television credits include Saturday Night Live, Late Night with Conan O'Brien, MTV Unplugged, The Tonight Show with Jay Leno, The Uncle Floyd Show, CBS This Morning, The Dennis Miller Show, and The Arsenio Hall Show.

Recognition 
In 2019, Babjak, along with his bandmates in the Smithereens, were inducted into the class of 2018 New Jersey Hall of Fame. He has also been inducted into the White Castle Hall of Fame class of 2002 for his song "White Castle Blues."

Babjak was rated #8 in the Asbury Park Press’ list of The 17 Greatest N.J. Guitarists of All Time.

His composition, "Waking Up on Christmas Morning," was rated # 9 in the Asbury Park Press "The Christmas Top 10".

According to Goldmine Magazine, among the bands influenced by the Smithereens was Nirvana.

Babjak's guitar and other memorabilia from the Smithereens are on display  at the Grammy Museum Experience in Newark at the Prudential Center.

Personal life 
Babjak lives in Manalapan Township, New Jersey. When he was not performing music, Babjak had a day job working at a bank.

References

Living people
1957 births
The Smithereens members
Carteret High School alumni
People from Carteret, New Jersey
People from Manalapan Township, New Jersey
Jersey Shore musicians
Singers from New Jersey
Songwriters from New Jersey
Guitarists from New Jersey
American male guitarists
20th-century American guitarists
20th-century American male musicians
21st-century American guitarists
21st-century American male musicians
American male songwriters